The Afghan cricket team toured Zimbabwe between January and February 2017. The tour consisted of five One Day International (ODI) matches. Ahead of the ODI series, the Afghanistan A cricket team played five "unofficial" ODI matches against the Zimbabwe A cricket team. All of those matches had List A status. Afghanistan won the List A series 4–1
and the ODI series 3–2.

Prior to the start of the ODI matches, Zimbabwe Cricket brought forward the fixtures in their domestic List A completion, the 2016–17 Pro50 Championship, in preparation for the tour.

Squads

Hamilton Masakadza was added to Zimbabwe's squad ahead of the 2nd ODI.

List A series

1st List A match

2nd List A match

3rd List A match

4th List A match

5th List A match

ODI series

1st ODI

2nd ODI

3rd ODI

4th ODI

5th ODI

References

External links
 List A series home at ESPN Cricinfo
 ODI series home at ESPN Cricinfo

2017 in Afghan cricket
2017 in Zimbabwean cricket
International cricket competitions in 2016–17
Afghan cricket tours of Zimbabwe